Sergei Leonidovich Garmash (born 1 September 1958) is a Soviet and Russian film and stage actor. He is a People's Artist of Russia. In 2013 he was a member of the jury at the 35th Moscow International Film Festival.

Biography

Early life and education
Sergei Garmash was born on September 1, 1958 in the city of Kherson of the Ukrainian SSR, in a family of workers. His mother, Lyudmila Ippolitovna was from a small village in Western Ukraine, she graduated after seven classes and spent her whole life working as a dispatcher at a bus station. Sergei's father, Leonid Trofimovich Garmash was a driver at first, then graduated from the institute and began to work in leadership positions.

Garmash was a difficult child, he was expelled from school several times. After school, he wished to enter the nautical institute, but ended up filing documents for the Dnepropetrovsk theatrical school. He graduated from the school with a degree in "Puppet Theater Artist". Then he worked in Kherson, traveling with tours to nearby villages and collective farms.

Two years later Garmash was called up for military service in the ranks of the Soviet Army in the building battalion. He served in the town of Bologoye.

After serving in the army, in 1980 Garmash went to Moscow to apply to theater schools. Initially he filed application documents for three theatrical institutions at the same time. Later he picked the Moscow Art Theater School for his studies. Upon completion of Moscow Art Theatre School (class I. M. Tarhanova) in 1984, Garmash was accepted into the troupe of the "Contemporary" Moscow theater.

Career
Sergei made his cinematic debut in 1984. His first work was the role of Urin in the heroic ballad of Alexei Simonov's Detachment with Aleksandr Feklistov. Then he acted in the films "In the Shooting Wilderness" (1985) by Vladimir Khotinenko, Wild Pigeon (1986) by Sergei Solovyov, "Ivan the Great" (1987) by Gabriel Yeghiazarova, Stalingrad (1989) by Yuri Ozerov, The Master and Margarita (1994) by Yuri Kara, Voroshilov Sharpshooter (1999) by Stanislav Govorukhin and many other films and series, before the beginning of the new millennium he starred in more than fifty films.

In 2001, for the role of the teacher of labor Semen Bespalchikov in the successful drama of Sergei Solovyov's Tender Age Garmash was awarded the prizes Nika Award and Golden Eagle. Later, Sergei received the Nika award for his roles in the films My Half-Brother Frankenstein (2004), 12 (2008) and Home (2011).

Garmash's significant roles include Major Korotkov in the detective series Kamenskaya, where he acted for five seasons, Yevgeny Markerants in the Mechanical Suite (2001) by Dmitry Meskhiev, Ivan in "Lover" (2002) by Valery Todorovsky, senior warrant officer Nikolai Krauz in the film 72 Meters by Vladimir Khotinenko, drunkard Yasha in Poor Relatives (2005) by Pavel Lungin, Major Popov in Katyn (2007) by Andrzej Wajda, Mels's father in the hit 1960s set musical Stilyagi (2008) by Valery Todorovsky.

Additionally, Sergei acted in the films Soundtrack of Passion (2009), Black Lightning (209), Lucky Trouble (2010), "Once" (2013), "The End of the Beautiful Era" (2015), The Duelist (2016), the series The Hethers of Major Sokolov (2014), Leningrad 46 (2015), The Investigator Tikhonov (2016) and Murka (2017), etc.

In 2017, the actor appeared in the films Attraction and "Cold Tango". He also appeared in Going Vertical, Matilda, as well as the comedy-adventure Partner, where he played a major police officer Khromov, whose soul and mind were transferred to the body of a year-old child.

Personal life
His wife is the Russian actress Inna Timofeeva (born 1963), a graduate of the Moscow Art Theatre School, theater actress of the Moscow theater "Contemporary".

Awards

Filmography

Films
 1986 Wild Pigeon - astronaut
 1987 Moonzund - sailor Pavlo Dybenko
 1989 Stalingrad - sergeant Yakov Pavlov
 1993 Children of Iron Gods - People in the pub
 1994 Life and Extraordinary Adventures of Private Ivan Chonkin - Milyaga, captain of the NKVD
 1994 The Master and Margarita - Ivan Bezdomny, poet
 1995 Wolf Blood
 1996 The Last Courier - Andrej Bubka
 1999 Strastnoy Boulevard - writer
 1999 The Rifleman of the Voroshilov Regiment - police Koshaev
 1999 The Admirer - Oleg Viktorovich
 2000 Tender Age
 2001 Mechanical Suite - Markerants
 2004 72 Meters - warrant officer Nikolai Karlovich Krausz
 2004 Our Own - chekist Tolya
 2005 Poor Relatives - wino Yasha
 2006 Piranha
 2007 12 - 3rd Juror
 2007 Katyń - captain Popov
 2008 Morphine - Vasiliy Osipovich Soborevsky
 2008-09 The Inhabited Island - Zef
 2008 Stilyagi - Mels's father
 2009 Newsmakers - professional killer
 2009 Black Lightning - Pavel Maykov, Dmitry's father
 2009 The Book of Masters - Magic Horse (voice only)
 2010 The Edge - major Fishman
 2010 Burnt by the Sun 2 - Father Alexander (in the credits - a legless sergeant on a barge)
 2010 Yolki - militia Valery Petrovich Sinitsyn
 2010 Lucky Trouble - coach Hlobustin
 2011 Home - Viktor Shamanov
 2011 Ivan Tsarevich and the Gray Wolf - Zmei Gorynych, voice
 2014 Leningrad 46 - Igor Danilov
 2015 Once - uncle Misha
 2016 The Dawns Here Are Quiet — narrator
 2016 The Duelist 2017 Attraction - deputy prime minister
 2017 Matilda - Emperor Alexander III
 2017 Going Vertical - Sergei Pavlov, Chairman of the State Committee for Sport of the USSR
 2022 Nakhimovtsy 2023 Cheburashka - Gena

TV
 2002 Brigada - San Sanych SWAT Commander (12 series)
 2003 Lines of Fate - Vershinin
 2005 The Case of "Dead Souls" 2005 Brezhnev - Kandaurov
 2005 The Fall of the Empire - Sakharov
 2012 The White Guard - Kozyr-Leshko, Colonel of Petlyura forces
 2017 Trotsky'' - Nikolai Trotsky

References

External links

1958 births
Living people
Actors from Kherson
Russian male film actors
Russian male stage actors
Soviet male film actors
Soviet male stage actors
Russian people of Ukrainian descent
Ukrainian Soviet Socialist Republic people
Academicians of the National Academy of Motion Picture Arts and Sciences of Russia
People's Artists of Russia
Moscow Art Theatre School alumni